The men's 10 kilometre sprint at the 2007 Asian Winter Games was held on 29 January 2007 at Beida Lake Skiing Resort, China.

Schedule
All times are China Standard Time (UTC+08:00)

Results

References

Results

External links
Official website

Men Sprint